Thonmi Sambhota (Thönmi Sambhoṭa, aka Tonmi Sambhodha;, Tib. , Wyl. thon mi sam+b+ho Ta; b. seventh cent.) is traditionally regarded as the inventor of the Tibetan script and author of the Sum cu pa and Rtags kyi 'jug pa in the 7th century AD. Thonmi Sambhota is not mentioned in any of the Old Tibetan Annals or other ancient texts, although the Annals does mention writing shortly after 650. The two treaties attributed to him must postdate the 13th century.

"According to Tibetan tradition, Songtsen Gampo sent a young man of the Thönmi or Thumi clan, Sambhoṭa son of Anu (or Drithorek Anu) to India in 632 with other youths, to learn the alphabet. The pattern chosen was the script of Kashmir. At all events, the ancient annals of Tun-huang record against the year 655 that 'the text of the laws was written'. It is staggering to realize that, in a couple of decades, not only was the Tibetan alphabet invented, but the script had been adapted to the Tibetan language by a highly complicated orthography, and used for the writing of documents. Thönmi is also said to have composed, no doubt later on, a very learned grammar on the Indian pattern."

Of the students sent to India, Thonmi Sambhota, said to have been the fourth of seven wise ministers of the emperor Songtsen Gampo, was the only one to return to Tibet. It seems that the Tibetan script he devised, in what is believed to be Pabonka Hermitage was based on the Brahmi and Gupta scripts which had been in use in India since c. 350 CE.

King Songtsen Gampo is said to have retired for four years to master the new script and grammar and then made many translations including twenty Avalokitesvara texts. Other translators quickly added to the corpus of Buddhist translations. The "Six Codices of the Tibetan constitution" were drawn up and court records, genealogies, legends and poetry were preserved in writing.

Footnotes

Further reading
 The Clear Mirror: A Traditional Account of Tibet's Golden Age. Sakyapa Sonam Gyaltsen, translated by McComas Taylor and Lama Choedak Yuthok. 1996. Snow Lion Publications, Ithaca, New York. . "Chapter 10: Minister Tonmi brings the alphabet from India, and King Songsten Gampo creates the Laws of the Ten Virtues", pp. 99–110.

 Sacred Scripts: A Meditative Journey Through Tibetan Calligraphy. Authors - Tashi Mannox & Robin Kyte-coles, endorsed by H.H Dalai Lama. 2016. Mandala Publications, San Rafael, CA. . "A brief history of the Tibetan Writing Systems: King Songsten Gampo turned to Minister Thönmi Sambhoṭa to renovate the Tibetan writing systems and grammar", pp. 3–12.

External links 

7th-century Tibetan people
Creators of writing systems
History of Tibet
People whose existence is disputed
Tibetan script